Matteo Anzolin (born 11 November 2000) is an Italian professional footballer who plays as defender for Austrian club Wolfsberger AC.

Club career 
In 2015, he joined Vicenza from Pordenone. Anzolin's first Serie B call up came on 3 March 2017 for a match against Cesena set to be played the following day without being fielded. In that year's summer, Anzolin moved to Juventus from Vicenza on a two-year loan, with an option for purchase. In 2019, Juventus decided to exercise the loan option, and bought him outright.

In July 2020, Anzolin sustained an ACL injury. He made his professional debut for Juventus U23 on 7 April 2021, in a 1–1 Serie C draw against Pistoiese.

On 20 July 2022, he was signed by Wolfsberger AC.

International career 
Anzolin represented Italy at under-16, under-17, under-18, and under-19 levels.

Career statistics

Club

International

References

External links 
 
 
 

2000 births
Living people
People from Portogruaro
Sportspeople from the Metropolitan City of Venice
Italian footballers
Association football defenders
L.R. Vicenza players
Juventus F.C. players
Juventus Next Gen players
Wolfsberger AC players
Serie C players
Italy youth international footballers
Footballers from Veneto